Margaret Moran Cho (born December 5, 1968) is an American comedian, actress, LGBT social activist, and musician. She is known for her stand-up routines, through which she critiques social and political problems, especially regarding race and sexuality. She rose to prominence after starring in the ABC sitcom All-American Girl (1994–95), and became an established stand-up comic in the subsequent years.

She has also had endeavors in fashion and music, and has her own clothing line. Cho has also frequently supported LGBT rights and has won awards for her humanitarian efforts on behalf of women, Asian Americans, and the LGBT community.

As an actress, she has acted in such roles as Charlene Lee in It's My Party and John Travolta's FBI colleague in the action movie Face/Off. Cho was part of the cast of the TV series Drop Dead Diva on Lifetime Television, in which she appeared as Teri Lee, a paralegal assistant. For her portrayal of Dictator Kim Jong-il on 30 Rock, she was nominated for the Primetime Emmy Award for Outstanding Guest Actress in a Comedy Series in 2012. In 2022, Cho co-starred in the film Fire Island, a portrayal of the LBGT Asian American experience in the eponymous gay village off the South Shore of Long Island.

Early life
Cho was born in 1968 to a family of Korean origin in San Francisco, California. Her paternal grandfather Myung-sook Cho, a Christian minister, worked for the Japanese as a station master during their occupation of Korea. When Japan withdrew from Korea at the end of World War II, he was denounced as a traitor by North Korea's Communist regime, and was forced to move with his family, including his son, her father Seung-hoon Cho, to South Korea. During the Korean War, Myung-sook ran an orphanage in Seoul. According to Margaret herself, she "grew up in the church." She was raised in a racially diverse neighborhood near the Ocean Beach section of San Francisco, which she described as a community of "old hippies, ex-druggies, burn-outs from the 1960s, drag queens, Chinese people, and Koreans. To say it was a melting pot – that's the least of it. It was a really confusing, enlightening, wonderful time." Cho's parents, Young-Hie and Seung-Hoon Cho, ran Paperback Traffic, a bookstore on Polk Street at California Street in San Francisco. Her father writes joke books and a newspaper column in Seoul, South Korea.

At school, Cho was bullied, saying that "I was hurt because I was different, and so sharing my experience of being beaten and hated and called fat and queer and foreign and perverse and gluttonous and lazy and filthy and dishonest and yet all the while remaining invisible heals me, and heals others when they hear it – those who are suffering right now."

Between the ages of five and twelve, Cho was "sexually molested by a family friend". On the Loveline May 21, 1997 show with Adam Carolla and Dr. Drew Pinsky, she talks about being raped by her uncle, while during the same time period he was raping his three-year-old daughter. She often skipped class and got bad grades in ninth and tenth grades, resulting in her expulsion from Lowell High School. Cho said she was "raped continuously through my youngest years" (by another acquaintance), and that when she told someone else about it and her classmates found out, she received hostile remarks justifying it, including accusations of being "so fat" that only a crazy person would have sex with her.

After Cho expressed an interest in performance, she auditioned and was accepted into the San Francisco School of the Arts, a San Francisco public high school for the arts. While at the school, she became involved with the school's improvisational comedy group alongside actors Sam Rockwell and Aisha Tyler.

At age 15, she worked as a phone sex operator, and she later worked as a dominatrix. After graduating from high school, Cho attended San Francisco State University, studying drama; she did not graduate.

Career

1994–97: Early stand-up and All-American Girl
After doing several shows in a club adjacent to her parents' bookstore, Cho launched a stand-up comedy career and spent several years developing her material in clubs. Cho's career began to build after appearances on television and university campuses. In 1992, she appeared on the unsuccessful Golden Girls spin-off The Golden Palace in a small role. In 1994, Cho won the American Comedy Award for Best Female Comedian. In 2010, on The View, she discussed her nervousness about doing The Golden Palace and thanked the late Rue McClanahan for her help with rehearsing. She also secured a coveted spot as opening act for Jerry Seinfeld; at about this time, she was featured on a Bob Hope special, and was also a frequent visitor to The Arsenio Hall Show.

That same year, ABC developed and aired a sitcom based on Cho's stand-up routine. The show, titled All-American Girl, was initially promoted as the first show prominently featuring an East Asian family, although the short lived sitcom Mr. T and Tina, which had starred Noriyuki "Pat" Morita as Mr. T., preceded it by nearly two decades.

Cho has expressed subsequent regret for much of what transpired during the production of the show, specifically:
 After network executives, especially executive producer Gail Berman, criticized her appearance and the roundness of her face, Cho starved herself for several weeks. Her rapid weight loss, done to modify her appearance by the time the pilot episode was filmed, caused kidney failure.
 The show suffered criticism from within the U.S. East Asian community over its perception of stereotyping. Producers told Cho at different times during production both that she was "too Asian" and that she was "not Asian enough." At one point during the course of the show, producers hired a coach to teach Cho how to "be more Asian."
 Much of the humor was broad and coarse, and at times, stereotypical portrayals of her close Korean relatives and gay bookshop customers were employed.

The show was canceled after suffering poor ratings and the effect of major content changes over the course of its single season (19 episodes).

After the show's 1995 cancellation, Cho became addicted to drugs and alcohol. As detailed in her 2002 autobiography, I'm the One That I Want, in 1995, her substance abuse was evident during a performance in Monroe, Louisiana, where she was booed off the stage by 800 college students after going on the stage drunk.

1995–2002: Stand-up, acting, and writing

Though her career and personal life were challenging after the show's cancellation, Cho eventually sobered up, refocused her energy, and developed new material. She hosted the New Year's Rockin' Eve 95 show with Steve Harvey. In 1997, she had a supporting role in the thriller film Face/Off starring Nicolas Cage and John Travolta, playing Wanda, one of the fellow FBI agents of Travolta's primary character.

In 1999, she wrote about her struggles with All-American Girl in her first one-woman show, I'm the One That I Want. That year, I'm the One That I Want won New York magazine's Performance of the Year award and was named one of the Great Performances of the year by Entertainment Weekly. At the same time, Cho wrote and published an autobiographical book with the same title, and the show itself was filmed and released as a concert film in 2000. Her material dealt with her difficulties breaking into show business because of her ethnicity and weight and her resulting struggle with and triumph over body image issues and drug and alcohol addiction. Cho also appeared in an episode of the HBO comedy Sex and the City's fourth season. The episode, titled "The Real Me," first aired on June 3, 2001, and also guest-starred Heidi Klum.

In 2004, the show Notorious C.H.O. (the title was derived from slain rapper The Notorious B.I.G.) referred to the comedian having been reared in 1970s San Francisco and her bisexuality. After completing Notorious C.H.O., she made another stand-up film, Revolution, released in 2004, and subsequently work on her first self-written film in which she starred. Bam Bam and Celeste, a low-budget comedy about a "fag hag" and her gay best friend, co-starred Cho's friend and co-touring act Bruce Daniels. The film premiered at the Toronto International Film Festival in 2005. On Valentine's Day of 2004, Cho spoke at the Marriage Equality Rally at the California State Capitol. Her speech can be seen in the documentary Freedom to Marry.

2005–2010: Other projects and television
In 2005, Cho released her second book, I Have Chosen to Stay and Fight, a compilation of essays and prose about global politics, human rights, and other topical issues. Cho launched a national book tour in support of the collection. An audio reading of the book was also released. A DVD of a live taping of her Assassin tour was released in conjunction with the book. The same year, Cho started promoting and touring with her new show, Assassin. The show became her fourth live concert film and premiered on the gay and lesbian premium cable network Here! TV in September 2005. In this DVD, she notably includes herself when talking about gay people, saying "we" and "our community." Posters for Assassin featured Cho in paratrooper gear and holding a microphone in the style of an automatic rifle, a reference to the infamous 1974 photo of heiress Patty Hearst.

Cho launched "The Sensuous Woman," a burlesque-style variety show tour, in Los Angeles on August 10, 2007, with tour dates scheduled through November 3, as of October 10. Scheduled tour stops meant to follow Los Angeles were Chicago, Illinois and New York City. On August 10, 2007 the San Francisco Chronicle reviewed the show, Cho's work, key events in her personal life and characterized the show thus: "In fact, as bawdy and bad-behaving as the cast gets, the whole show feels more like a crazy family reunion than a performance."

Also in 2007, Cho appeared in The Dresden Dolls' video of their song "Shores of California," which was MCed by Amanda Palmer and in The Cliks's video for "Eyes in the Back of My Head," in which she appeared as Lucas Silveira's lover. She also provided the character voice for a character named Condie Ling on the Logo animated series Rick & Steve: The Happiest Gay Couple in All the World. Her episodes began airing in 2007.

The premiere performance of Cho's "Beautiful" tour was on February 28, 2008, in Sydney, Australia as part of the Gay and Lesbian Mardi Gras Festival. Cho was also the Chief of Parade for the festival's annual parade along Oxford Street on March 1. During her stay in Sydney, Cho was filmed shopping for parade outfits in a drag store with Kathy Griffin and Cyndi Lauper for Griffin's Bravo series My Life on the D-List. The episode featuring Cho aired on June 26, 2008.

Cho and her family and friends appeared in an episode of NBC's series Celebrity Family Feud, which premiered on June 24, 2008. Later that summer, she appeared in her own semi-scripted reality sitcom for VH1, The Cho Show, which premiered on August 21, 2008 and lasted one season. She next appeared in the supporting cast of the series Drop Dead Diva, which debuted in July 2009.

2011–present: Further appearances and tours
In April 2011, Cho guest starred on the comedy 30 Rock in the episode "Everything Sunny All the Time Always." She portrayed Kim Jong-Il, then the leader of North Korea, that required her to speak both Korean and English. She was nominated for a Primetime Emmy Award for Outstanding Guest Actress in a Comedy Series. She later returned to portray Kim Jong-Il's son, Kim Jong-Un. [S:6, E:21]  In 2010, Cho was a contestant on the 11th season of Dancing with the Stars.

Also in 2011, online human rights awareness project America 2049 had Margaret appear as one of the main characters, whose videos were played as part of the main storyline. The Facebook-interfaced game uses a fictional, fractioned future to highlight today's social inequities.

Since January 2013, Cho has been the co-host of the weekly podcast Monsters of Talk along with Jim Short. Cho embarked on her "Mother" tour in the fall of 2013 and slated it for engagements in Europe in 2014. The title of the tour refers not to Cho's impressions of her own mother, but to Cho herself. It is her nickname for the figure she has played to her many gay friends over the years. In 2014, she participated in Do I Sound Gay?, a documentary film directed and produced by David Thorpe.  The film is about stereotypes of gay men's speech patterns.

In January 2019, Cho competed in season one of The Masked Singer as "Poodle". She was eliminated in Episode 4.

In July 2019, Cho started a solo podcast called The Margaret Cho, which features guests who primarily work in show business. Guests have included Queer Eye'''s Jonathan Van Ness, tattooist and reality TV figure Kat Von D, screenwriter Diablo Cody, drag queen Jackie Beat, and comedian and TV host Michael Yo. Cho has a chapter giving advice in Tim Ferriss' book Tools of Titans.

In February 2022, she was cast in the documentary series Everything's Gonna Be All White, airing on Showtime.

In June 2022, Cho co-starred in a romantic comedy film, Fire Island, directed by Andrew Ahn, airing on Hulu

 Comedic style and political advocacy 

Cho is also well known for discussing her relationship with her mother, particularly in imitating her mother's heavily accented speech. Her depictions of "Mommy" have become a popular part of her routine. Cho's comedy routines are often explicit. She has covered substance abuse, eating disorders, her bisexuality and obsession with gay men, and Asian-American stereotypes, among other subjects, in her stand-up routines.

A substantial segment of her material and advocacy addresses LGBT issues. In addition to her shows, Cho also developed an additional outlet for her advocacy with the advent of her website and her daily blog. When San Francisco Mayor Gavin Newsom directed that San Francisco's city hall issue marriage licenses to same-sex couples in San Francisco in 2004 (until reversed by the state supreme court), Cho started Love is Love is Love, a website promoting the legalization of gay marriage in the United States.

Cho's material often features commentary on politics and contemporary American culture. She has also been outspoken about her dislike of former President George W. Bush. She began to draw intense fire from conservatives over her fiercely anti-Bush commentary; a live performance in Houston, Texas, was threatened with picketing. Although protesters never showed up, she held a counter protest outside the club until security told her she had to go inside.

In 2004, Cho was performing at a corporate event in a hotel when, after ten minutes, her microphone was cut off and a band was instructed to begin playing. Cho claims that this was because the manager of the hotel was offended by anti-Bush administration comments. Cho's payment, which was issued by way of check directly to a non-profit organization, a defense fund for the West Memphis Three, initially bounced but was eventually honored.

In July 2004, during the Democratic National Convention, Cho was disinvited to speak at a Human Rights Campaign/National Stonewall Democrats fundraiser out of fear that her comments might cause controversy. In November 2005, she campaigned to pardon Stanley Tookie Williams, an early Crips gang leader, for his death sentence for four murders, but this campaign failed; on December 13, 2005, after exhausting all forms of appeal, Williams was executed by lethal injection at San Quentin State Prison, California.

In 2007, Cho hosted the multi-artist True Colors Tour, which traveled through 15 cities in the United States and Canada.  The tour, sponsored by the Logo channel, began on June 8, 2007. Headlined by Cyndi Lauper, the tour also included Debbie Harry, Erasure, The Gossip, Rufus Wainwright, The Dresden Dolls, The MisShapes, Rosie O'Donnell, Indigo Girls, The Cliks, and other special guests.  Profits from the tour helped to benefit the Human Rights Campaign as well as PFLAG and The Matthew Shepard Foundation.

On January 25, 2008, Cho officially gave her support to Barack Obama for the nomination on the Democratic ticket for the 2008 U.S. presidential election. After Republican Presidential candidate John McCain announced his running mate, Governor Sarah Palin of Alaska, Cho said of her, "I think [Palin] is the worst thing to happen to America since 9/11."

After same-sex marriage became legal in California in May 2008, Cho was deputized by the City of San Francisco to perform marriages there.

Other ventures
Fashion and burlesque

In 2003, Cho founded a clothing line with friend and fashion designer Ava Stander called High Class Cho. The company eventually went defunct.

In 2004, Cho took up bellydancing and in 2006 started her own line of bellydancing belts and accessories called Hip Wear; these she sold through her website. She also had extensive tattooing done to cover the majority of her back.

In November 2006, Cho joined the board of Good Vibrations, a sex toy retailer. With fellow comedian Diana Yanez, she co-wrote "My Puss", a rap song which they recorded as the duo of "Maureen and Angela." Cho appeared in and directed the music video for the song. In December 2006, Cho appeared on the Sci-Fi Channel's miniseries The Lost Room as Suzie Kang.

On an episode of The Hour with host George Stroumboulopoulos, Cho mentioned that she loved Broken Social Scene and wishes to be a part of the band (offering to play the rainstick or the triangle). On air, Stroumboulopoulos called band member Kevin Drew from his cell phone, and Cho made her request to join the band via his voicemail.

In April 2009, Cho was photographed by photographer Austin Young and appeared in a Bettie Page–inspired "Heaven Bound" art show.

Music
In September 2008, Cho released her single, "I Cho Am a Woman," on iTunes. The song, produced by Desmond Child, was featured on her VH1 series.

Throughout 2010, she worked on a full-length album, going through the titles "Guitarded" and "Banjovi" before finally settling on Cho Dependent. Released on August 24, 2010, the album was supported by music videos for "I'm Sorry," "Eat Shit and Die," and "My Lil' Wayne;" Liam Kyle Sullivan directed the first two. It was nominated for a 2010 Grammy award for Best Comedy Album. In 2011 Showtime released a stand-up comedy special, titled Margaret Cho: Cho Dependent, which featured musical performances from the album.

In May 2010, Cho directed, and appeared in, the music video for "I Wanna Be a Bear," a song by "Pixie Herculon," a pseudonym of Jill Sobule. In 2011, Cho sang the Bob Mould song "Your Favorite Thing" at the tribute concert See A Little Light with Grant-Lee Phillips.

In July 2014, she appeared in "Weird Al" Yankovic's music video for "Tacky."

In April 2016, Cho released her second album, American Myth.

In May 2016, she rapped on and made an appearance in the music video for "Green Tea", a song by rapper Awkwafina. Both play with stereotypes of people of East Asian descent in hopes that "women of color embrace their quirkiness, their sexuality, their inner-child and their creativity with passion."

Also in 2016, Cho featured on the track "Ride or Die" on the album Sweet T by American drag queen and singer/artist Ginger Minj.

Podcast
In July 2019, Cho started a podcast called The Margaret Cho. It features guests who primarily work in show business and features original music by Garrison Starr.

Personal life
Cho married Al Ridenour, an artist involved in The Cacophony Society and the Art of Bleeding, in 2003. Cho was featured in an Art of Bleeding performance in March 2006. She described her marriage as "very conventional and conservative, I think. I mean we're such weird people that people just can't imagine that we would have a conventional marriage. But, yeah, we are very conventional." They were separated in September 2014 and Cho confirmed their separation in December. Cho referred to herself as "divorced" in an April 2015 profile in The New York Times, but actually filed for divorce in August 2015.La Ferla, Ruth. "For Margaret Cho, Nothing Is Too Private for a Punch Line". The New York Times. April 10, 2015. In April 2019 it was reported that the divorce was finalized.

In the early 1990s, Cho dated director Quentin Tarantino.

, Cho identified as a Christian. , Cho was living in Peachtree City, Georgia, as Drop Dead Diva was filmed in the Atlanta area.

Cho is openly bisexual, and has stated that she has had "a lot of experience in the area of polyamory and alternative sexuality in general." When discussing her sexuality in a 2018 Huffington Post interview, Cho said, "I don't know using 'bisexual' is right because that indicates that there's only two genders, and I don't believe that. I've been with people all across the spectrum of gender and who have all kinds of different expressions of gender, so it's so hard to say. Maybe 'pansexual' is technically the more correct term but I like 'bisexual' because it's kind of '70s." Cho states that she “loves” Fire Island and spends summers there.

Cho was a guest on comedian Bobby Lee's Tigerbelly Podcast Episode 71, which was uploaded on December 16, 2016. In that episode, she recounted an incident between her and actress Tilda Swinton. According to Cho, Swinton contacted her via email to discuss the Asian American community's reaction to the news that Swinton had been cast to play the character Ancient One, who in  comic books is Tibetan, in the movie version of Doctor Strange. Cho found the inquiry odd, since she did not know Swinton and had never talked to her before, nor did she have anything to do with the movie or casting. On December 21, Swinton released the email exchange between her and Cho to the website Jezebel. According to Swinton, she had contacted Cho to better understand why Asian Americans were upset about the casting. In response to the release, Cho stated that she stands by her words both on TigerBelly and in the email exchange.

Cho revealed in a panel discussion that after doing genealogy testing, she discovered that she had some Chinese ancestry.

 Accolades 
 In 2000, her "E! Celebrity Profile" won a Gracie Allen Award from the American Women in Radio and Television organization acknowledging its "superior quality and effective portrayal of the changing roles and concerns of women."
 The same year, the Gay & Lesbian Alliance Against Defamation (GLAAD) awarded her with a Golden Gate Award and described her as an entertainer who, "as a pioneer, has made a significant difference in promoting equal rights for all, regardless of sexual orientation or gender identity."
 In 2001, she was given a Lambda Liberty Award by Lambda Legal for "pressing us to see how false constructions of race, sexuality, and gender operate similarly to obscure and demean identity."
 In 2003, she was given an Intrepid Award by the National Organization for Women.
 In 2004, she was awarded with the First Amendment Award from the American Civil Liberties Union.
 In 2007, she won for Outstanding Comedy Performance in AZN's Asian Excellence Awards.
April 30, 2008 was declared "Margaret Cho Day" in San Francisco.
 In 2015, Joan Juliet Buck, writing in W, called Cho a modern-day femme fatale, writing:

[N]ot all women comedians are dangerous; some are just very funny: Tina Fey and Amy Poehler are too relatable, Joan Rivers was too firmly ensconced in the society that she mocked. Amy Schumer relies a little too much on the word "pussy" to be any kind of threat, though she would like very much to be a bad person. On the other hand, ... Margaret Cho know[s] no boundaries and inspire[s] palpable fear anytime [she] begin[s] one of [her] riffs.

Tours
 "I'm the One That I Want" (1999)
 "Notorious C.H.O." (2002)
 "Revolution" (2003)
 "State of Emergency" (2004)
 "Assassin" (2005)
 "True Colors" (2007–2008)
 "Beautiful" (2008)
 "Cho Dependent" (2010)
 "Mother!" (2013)
 "The 'There's No I in Team but there is a Cho in PsyCHO' Tour" (Often referred to simply as "The PsyCHO Tour") (2015)
 "Fresh Off The Bloat Tour" (2017)

Filmography

 Film 

 Television 

 Comedy Specials 

 Web 

Podcasts

Monsters of Talk
2013-2015: Co-hosted w/ Jim Short, 131 episodes

The Margaret Cho

Bibliography

 Discography 
 Comedy albums 

 Music albums 

 Singles 

 Appearances 

Videography
Music videos as main artist

Directed by

References

External links

 
 
 Alternet.org video
 Margaret Cho Video produced by Makers: Women Who Make America''
 Margaret Cho Wilbur Theatre in Boston, MA review and photos by Jen Vesp 
 Interview with MEAWW
 

1968 births
Living people
Activists from California
Actresses from San Francisco
American actresses of Korean descent
American musicians of Korean descent
American stand-up comedians
American women comedians
American comedians of Asian descent
Asian-American feminists
Bisexual actresses
Bisexual feminists
Comedians from California
Feminist comedians
Feminist musicians
American LGBT people of Asian descent
Bisexual comedians
LGBT fashion designers
American LGBT songwriters
LGBT people from California
Bisexual songwriters
American LGBT rights activists
Lowell High School (San Francisco) alumni
Participants in American reality television series
People from Peachtree City, Georgia
San Francisco State University alumni
20th-century American actresses
21st-century American actresses
20th-century American comedians
21st-century American comedians
Polyamorous people
American bisexual actors
American LGBT comedians
American bisexual writers